Sindumin is a town located in the district of Sipitang in Sabah, Malaysia. The town was previously known as "Mengalong" in the 1960s. It is situated on the Sabah-Sarawak border in the Interior Division of Sabah along the Mengalong river. It is also one of the towns within the Brunei Bay. There are Kedayan, Murut, and Lundayeh /Lun Bawang.

Towns in Sabah